March Pursuivant of Arms is a Scottish pursuivant of arms of the Court of the Lord Lyon.

The office was first mentioned in 1515 and it is associated with the part of the Border area that was known as the Marches, i.e. the whole border area.

The badge of office is a demi lion rampant holding a rose Gules and gorged with a coronet of four fleur de lys (two visible) and four crosses pattée (one and two halves visible) Or.

The office is currently held by Philip Tibbetts, Esq.

Holders of the office

See also
Officer of Arms
Pursuivant
Court of the Lord Lyon
Heraldry Society of Scotland

References

External links
The Court of the Lord Lyon



Court of the Lord Lyon
Offices of arms